Mahmood Mansoor Ali Abdulla (born 1 June 1980) is a Bahraini professional footballer who plays as a goalkeeper. He plays for the Bahrain national football team. He was a member of the Bahrain squad at the 2011 AFC Asian Cup.

References

External links
Goal Profile

1978 births
Living people
Bahraini footballers
2011 AFC Asian Cup players
Association football goalkeepers
Bahrain international footballers